Chaco socos is a species of mygalomorph spiders of Chile, named after its type locality: Socos, Limarí, Region IV (Coquimbo region). This species differs from C. tigre by its spermathecae having a longer duct and a less globose fundus, and by constructing a beveled door for its burrow; the general colouration is grayish, while C. tigre is more brownish coloured.

Description
The labium possesses five cuspules. Its posterior sternal sigilla is small and shallow. Its cephalothorax is ashgray, with a lycosid-like pattern, while the legs and palpi are gray with darker spots; its abdomen yellowish with darker dorsal spots.

The labium possesses three cuspules. The colour is the same as in the male.

Distribution and behaviour
This species has been collected in two localities, in high mountains near the sea, with moist soil. The animals construct a thick door for their burrow, which fits into the burrow opening. The outer face of the door is slightly concave, while the burrow walls are well-compacted and lined with silk.

See also
Spider anatomy
List of Nemesiidae species

References

External links
ADW entry

Nemesiidae
Spiders of South America
Spiders described in 1995
Endemic fauna of Chile